Adrian High School or Adrian School is a public high school located in Adrian, Texas (USA) and classified as a 1A school by the UIL.  It is part of the Adrian Independent School District located in south central Oldham County.

Programs

Athletics
Adrian ISD competes in UIL 1A cross country, basketball, track, tennis, and golf.

FFA
Adrian FFA competes in leadership, career, and speaking development events, in addition to recordbook and scholarship awards, and stock showing.

UIL
Adrian ISD participates in elementary, junior high, and high school UIL events, including academics, speaking, and theater.

References

External links
Adrian ISD

Public high schools in Texas
Schools in Oldham County, Texas
Public middle schools in Texas
Public elementary schools in Texas